Steve McQueen (March 24, 1930 – November 7, 1980) was an American actor who had an extensive career in film and television. Popularly known as "The King of Cool", McQueen's screen persona was that of portraying cool, reticent antihero roles, which appealed strongly to the masses. This led him to cement his status as one of the most famous celebrities in Hollywood during the counterculture of the 1960s.

After making his debut appearing in an uncredited role in the crime drama Girl on the Run (1953), McQueen featured in the Paul Newman starrer Somebody Up There Likes Me (1956), where he played the uncredited role of Fidel, a member of the protagonist's gang. In 1958, he appeared in the science fiction film The Blob, which was his first film as a lead actor. It proved to be commercially successful at the box office, grossing ($ in 2022) against a budget of ($ in 2022). McQueen became known for portraying bounty hunter Josh Randall in the CBS television series Wanted Dead or Alive (1958–1961). He continued to act in films, playing the lead in The Great St. Louis Bank Robbery (1959), and in a supporting role as a corporal in Never So Few (1959), his first of three films with John Sturges.

In 1960, McQueen achieved stardom when he co-starred alongside Yul Brynner in Sturges' western, The Magnificent Seven, which was based on Akira Kurosawa's 1954 film Seven Samurai. After a series of unsuccessful films for the next two years, McQueen teamed up with Sturges again in the war drama The Great Escape (1963), where he played Virgil Hilts, a World War II prisoner of war who along with fellow Allied POWs makes an escape from a high security prisoner-of-war camp. It emerged as one of the highest-grossing films of the year, winning McQueen the award for Best Actor at the Moscow International Film Festival. In The Great Escape, a shot of Hilts riding a motorcycle and jumping a series of barbed-wire fences (performed by a stuntman) to escape from German soldiers is considered one of the best stunts ever made. McQueen received his first Golden Globe Award for Best Actor nomination for his role of a musician in Love with the Proper Stranger (1963), where he was paired opposite Natalie Wood. He achieved critical and commercial success with The Cincinnati Kid (1965) and The Sand Pebbles (1966), with the latter garnering him the only Academy Award for Best Actor nomination of his career. In 1968, McQueen appeared as millionaire Thomas Crown in the crime film The Thomas Crown Affair, and in the thriller Bullitt as the eponymous police detective Frank Bullitt. These films fared well at the box office, with the latter garnering acclaim for its stunt sequences, particularly the car chase. For his performance in The Reivers (1969), McQueen earned a third Golden Globe Award nomination.

McQueen began the 1970s with the sports drama Le Mans (1971), a fictional take on the annual 24 Hours of Le Mans endurance races. The film was a critical and commercial disappointment, leaving him almost bankrupt. He followed it by starring in two back-to-back films under Sam Peckinpah: the western Junior Bonner (1972), where he featured as the titular character, a rodeo rider, and the action film The Getaway (1972), where he appears as an ex-conman who flees to Mexico with his wife after being double-crossed by his partners-in-crime. In the latter, he was paired opposite his second wife, Ali MacGraw. Both films were critically acclaimed. While Junior Bonner did not enjoy box office success, The Getaway went on to become one of the highest-grossing films of the year, marking a comeback for McQueen. The following year, he featured alongside Dustin Hoffman in the prison film Papillon playing Henri Charrière, a prisoner convicted of murder who makes an escape attempt with fellow convict Louis Dega (Hoffman). McQueen's performance earned him his fourth and final Golden Globe Award nomination in the Best Actor category. He then starred alongside Paul Newman as a SFFD chief in the disaster drama The Towering Inferno (1974). McQueen received $12 million for acting in the film, making him the highest-paid actor in the world up to that point. The film was commercially successful, grossing ($ in 2022) against a ($ in 2022) budget. After a four-year hiatus in which he focused on his motorcycle racing career, McQueen returned to acting when he was cast against type as a scientist in An Enemy of the People. He completed two more films before his death: Tom Horn and The Hunter (both released in 1980).

Film

Television

Notes

References

Bibliography

External links 
 

Male actor filmographies
American filmographies